Ticky Holgado (24 June 1944, in Toulouse – 22 January 2004, in Paris), pseudonym of Joseph Holgado, was a French actor and a frequent collaborator with Jean-Pierre Jeunet.

With Delicatessen (1991) by Jean-Pierre Jeunet and Marc Caro, Ticky Holgado saw his acting talent acknowledged. Gérard Jugnot wrote for him the character of the beggar who meets the frame in the unemployment becoming NFA (played by Jugnot) in Une époque formidable (1990).

He received the Caesar of the best male bit part in 1992 for Une époque formidable and in 1996 for Gazon maudit.

In September 2003, Holgado announced the remission of his lung cancer, which had considerably rarefied his appearances on the screen since 2000. On 5 January 2004, he had just begun work on a new film with Lelouch, but he succumbed to cancer on 22 January 2004.  He left a posthumous message, in the form of a document which appeared on his hospital bed after taking him to surgery to remove his 4th cancerous tumor. Holgado declared there: "It is necessary to tell to people that it's absolutely necessary to stop smoking".

Ticky Holgado was buried at the Père Lachaise Cemetery (45th division).

Filmography

 Les surdoués de la première compagnie (1980, directed by Michel Gérard) (starring Bernard Lavalette, Hubert Deschamps) – Le voisin
 Madame Claude 2 (1981, directed by François Mimet) – (uncredited)
 Putain d'histoire d'amour (1981, directed by Gilles Béhat) (starring Richard Berry, Mirella D'Angelo) – Un de la bande des Gominés
 Belles, blondes et bronzées (1981, directed by Max Pécas) (starring Philippe Klébert, Xavier Deluc) – Gus
 Comment draguer toutes les filles (1981, directed by Michel Vocoret) – Antoine, le garagiste
 On n'est pas sorti de l'auberge (1982, directed by Max Pécas)
 Circulez y a rien à voir! (1983, directed by Patrice Leconte) – Le planton N°1
 Les planqués du régiment (1983, directed by Michel Caputo) – Le militaire qui vient chercher des fleurs pour le maréchal Mégalo
 On l'appelle catastrophe (1983, directed by Richard Balducci) (starring Michel Leeb, Darry Cowl) – Alphonse
 Les branchés à St. Tropez (1983, directed by Max Pécas) (starring Olivia Dutron, Xavier Deluc) – Ticky
 Mesrine (1984, directed by André Génovès)
 Le juge (1984, directed by Philippe Lefebvre) – Un garde
 Le Fou du roi (1984, directed by Yvan Chiffre) (starring Diane Bellego, Gaëtan Bloom)
 Les Ripoux (1984, directed by Claude Zidi) (starring Thierry Lhermitte, Philippe Noiret) – Alphonse
 Comment draguer tous les mecs (1984, directed by Jean-Paul Feuillebois) – Frère Gontran
 Brigade des mœurs (1985, directed by Max Pécas) (starring Thierry Carbonnières, Jean-marc Maurel)
 Les rois du gag (1985, directed by Claude Zidi)
 Adieu blaireau (1985, directed by Bob Decout) – Le barman 
 Le bonheur a encore frappé (1986, directed by Jean-Luc Trotignon) – Gérant du supermarché
 Nuit d'ivresse (1986, directed by Bernard Nauer) (starring Josiane Balasko and Thierry Lhermitte) – L'électro
 Manon des sources (1986, directed by Claude Berri) (starring Yves Montand, Daniel Auteuil) – Le Spécialiste
 Sale destin (1987, directed by Sylvain Madigan)
 Lévy et Goliath (1987, directed by Gérard Oury) – Le faux bossu
 Les keufs (1987, directed by Josiane Balasko) (starring Josiane Balasko, Isaach Bankolé) – Blondel / Insp. Blondel
 Sans peur et sans reproche (1988, directed by Gérard Jugnot) (starring Remi Martin, Roland Giraud) – Mignard de Parthode
 Le mari de la coiffeuse (1990, directed by Patrice Leconte) (starring Jean Rochefort, Anna Galiena) – Morvoisieux Son-in-Law
 Le Château de ma mère (1990, directed by Yves Robert) (starring Julien Ciamaca, Philippe Caubère) – Binucci
 Uranus (1990, directed by Claude Berri) (starring Michel Blanc, Gérard Depardieu) – Mégrin, l'avocat
 Delicatessen (1991, directed by Jean-Pierre Jeunet, Marc Caro) (starring Dominique Pinon, Marie-Laure Dougnac) – Marcel Tapioca
 Les secrets professionnels du Dr Apfelglück (1991, directed by Alessandro Capone, Stéphane Clavier) (starring Josiane Balasko, Alain Chabat) – Le Ténardie
 Une époque formidable... (1991, directed by Gérard Jugnot) (starring Richard Bohringer, Victoria Abril, César du meilleur second rôle masculin) – Crayon
 Mayrig (1991, directed by Henri Verneuil) (starring Richard Berry, Claudia Cardinale)
 My Life Is Hell (1991, directed by Josiane Balasko) (starring Daniel Auteuil, Josiane Balasko) – El Diablo
 The Supper (1992, directed by Edouard Molinaro) (starring Claude Brasseur, Claude Rich) – Jacques
 Tango (1993, directed by Patrice Leconte) – Waiter
 Drôles d'oiseaux ! (1993, directed by Peter Kassovitz) (starring Bernard Giraudeau, Patrick Chesnais) – Benoit Cabane
 Justinien Trouvé, ou le bâtard de Dieu (1993, directed by Christian Fechner) (starring Pierre-Olivier Mornas, Bernard-Pierre Donnadieu) – Beaulouis
 Tombés du ciel (1993, directed by Philippe Lioret) (starring Jean Rochefort, Marisa Paredes) – Serge
 L'honneur de la tribu (1993, directed by Mahmoud Zemmouri) – Martial
 Gazon maudit (1995, directed by Josiane Balasko) (starring Victoria Abril, Josiane Balasko, Alain Chabat) (Nominated – César Award for Best Supporting Actor) – Antoine
 Les Misérables (1995, directed by Claude Lelouch) (starring Jean-Paul Belmondo, Michel Boujenah) – Le gentil voyou / Kind Hoodlum
 Les drôles de Blackpool (1995, directed by Peter Chelsom) (starring Oliver Platt, Oliver Reed) – Battiston
 La Cité des enfants perdus (1995, directed by Jean-Pierre Jeunet, Marc Caro) (starring Ron Perlman, Judith Vittet) – Ex-Acrobat
 Les Milles (le train de la liberté) (1995, directed by Sebastien Grall) (starring Philippe Noiret, Rüdiger Vogler) – Capt. Moinard
 Lumière et compagnie (1995, directed by Lasse Hallström, Abbas Kiarostami) (starring Pernilla August, Romane Bohringer) – (segment "Claude Lelouch")
 Let's Hope it Lasts (1996, directed by Michel Thibaud) (starring Gérard Darmon, Catherina Jacob, Emmanuelle Seigner) – Joseph Ponty
 Hommes, femmes, mode d'emploi (1996, directed by Claude Lelouch) – Toc Toc, Loulou's Father
 Le Plus Beau Métier du monde (1996, directed by Gérard Lauzier) (starring Gérard Depardieu, Michèle Laroque) – Baudouin
 La chasse au rhinocéros à Budapest (1997, directed by Michael Haussman) (starring Nick Cave) – Alcoholic Man
 Amour et confusions (1997, directed by Patrick Braoudé) (starring Patrick Braoudé, Kristin Scott Thomas) – The sexologist
 Que la lumière soit (1998, directed by Arthur Joffe) (starring Hélène de Fougerolles, Tchéky Karyo) – L'ange René
 Prison à domicile (1998, directed by Christophe Jacrot) (starring Jean-Roger Milo, Hélène Vincent) – Jules Klarh
 Le sourire du clown (1998, directed by Eric Besnard avec Bruno Putzulu) – Ian
 Le schpountz (1999, directed by Gérard Oury) (starring Smaïn, Sabine Azéma) – Oncle Baptiste
 Les Acteurs (2000, directed by Bertrand Blier) (starring Pierre Arditi, Josiane Balasko) – Le clochard cul-de-jatte
 Most Promising Young Actress (2000, directed by Gérard Jugnot) (starring Gérard Jugnot, Bérénice Bejo, Chantal Lauby) – Un SDF
 Le Fabuleux Destin d'Amélie Poulain (2000, directed by Jean-Pierre Jeunet) (starring Audrey Tautou, Mathieu Kassovitz) – L'homme dans la photo
 Philosophale (2001, directed by Farid Fedjer avec Yves Rénier)
 Le Barbier (2001, Short, directed by Jon Carnoy) (starring Ticky Holgado, François Levantal) – Le barbier
 Monsieur Batignole (2002, directed by Gérard Jugnot) (starring Gérard Jugnot, Jules Sitruk) – Lucien Morel
 3 zéros (2002, directed by Fabien Onteniente) (starring Samuel Le Bihan, Gérard Lanvin) – Angelo
 And now... Ladies and Gentlemen (2002, directed by Claude Lelouch) (starring Jeremy Irons, Patricia Kaas) – Boubou
 Station 137 (2002, directed by Bruno François-Boucher)
 Le temps du RMI (2002, directed by Farid Fedjer avec Laure Sainclair)
 Tais-toi ! (2003, directed by Francis Veber) (starring Jean Reno, Gérard Depardieu) – Martineau
 Les gaous (2003, directed by Igor Sekulic) – Jojo
 The Car Keys (2003, directed by Laurent Baffie) – Le chanteur du happy-end
 Les Parisiens (2004, directed by Claude Lelouch) (starring Massimo Ranieri, Maïwenn Le Besco) – Dieu
 Un long dimanche de fiançailles (2004, directed by Jean-Pierre Jeunet) (starring Audrey Tautou, Gaspard Ulliel) – Germain Pire
 Le courage d'aimer'' (2005, directed by Claude Lelouch) – Dieu

References

External links

 
 

1944 births
2004 deaths
French male film actors
Deaths from lung cancer in France
Burials at Père Lachaise Cemetery